is a Japanese pink film actress. She has appeared in award-winning pink films, and was herself given a "Best Actress" award for her work in this genre in 2005.

Life and career 
Konatsu was born in Japan's Nagano Prefecture in 1982. After graduating from junior college, she moved to Tokyo where she worked in the beauty industry and did some gravure modeling in 2003. She made her acting debut in the July 2004 V-cinema production  directed by Yuji Tajiri.

Konatsu had her film debut in director Mototsugu Watanabe's  (2004). Her first leading role was later that same year, in Mitsuru Meike's Bitter Sweet.

January 14, 2006, the premiere date of Shinji Imaoka's  aka Frog Song, was also Konatsu's birthday. The director and staff presented Konatsu with a surprise birthday cake on stage at the occasion. The film was named the best pink release for 2005, and Konatsu was given the award for Best Actress for her performance.

She gave birth to her first child in February 2007 and as of 2011 was working for a "well-known clothing company".

Filmography
  (September 2004)
 Bitter Sweet (October 2004)
 Paid Companionship Story: Girls Who Want to Do It (June 2005)
 Blind Love (August 2005)
  (October 2005)
 Tokyo Zombie (December 2005)
  (January 2006)

Bibliography

English

Japanese

References

 
|-
! colspan="3" style="background: #DAA520;" | Pink Grand Prix
|-

|-
! colspan="3" style="background: #DAA520;" | Pinky Ribbon Awards
|-

External links 
 

1982 births
Japanese film actresses
Pink film actors
Japanese gravure idols
Living people
People from Nagano Prefecture